The Coins of the Romanian leu have been issued since the introduction of the Romanian leu in 1867.

First leu

In 1867, copper 1, 2, 5 and 10 bani were issued, with gold 20 lei (known as poli after the French Napoleons) first minted the next year. These were followed, between 1870 and 1873, by silver 50 bani, 1 and 2 lei. Silver 5 lei were added in 1880. Uniquely, the 1867 issue used the spelling 1 banu rather than 1 ban.

In 1900, cupro-nickel 5, 10 and 20 bani coins were introduced, with holed versions following in 1905. The production of coins ceased in 1914, recommencing in 1921 with aluminium 25 and 50 bani pieces. Cupro-nickel 1 and 2 lei coins were introduced in 1924, followed by nickel brass 5, 10 and 20 lei in 1930. In 1932, silver 100 lei coins were issued. However, inflation meant that, in 1935, smaller silver 250 lei coins were introduced with nickel 100 lei coins being issued in 1936, followed by nickel 50 lei in 1937.

In 1941 and 1942, zinc 2, 5 and 20 lei coins were introduced, together with silver 200 and 500 lei. Nickel-clad-steel 100 lei followed in 1943, with brass 200 and 500 lei issued in 1945. In 1946 and 1947, a new coinage was issued consisting of aluminium 500 lei, brass 2000 and 10,000 lei, and silver 25,000 and 100,000 lei.

King Carol I

King Ferdinand I

The production of coins ceased in 1914, recommencing in 1921 with aluminium 25 and 50 bani pieces.

Cupro-nickel 1 and 2 lei coins were introduced in 1924, followed by nickel brass 10, 20 and 50 lei in 1930.

King Michael I (first reign)

King Carol II

In 1932, silver 100 lei coins were issued. However, inflation meant that, in 1935, smaller silver 250 lei coins were introduced with nickel 100 lei coins being issued in 1936, followed by nickel 50 lei in 1937.

King Michael I (second reign)

Second leu
In 1947, coins were issued before the abdication of King Michael I, in denominations of 50 bani, 1, 2 and 5 lei.

King Michael I

People's Republic of Romania
After the creation of the People's Republic, new coins were issued between 1948 and 1952, in denominations of 1, 2, 5 and 20 lei.

Third leu

People's Republic of Romania 

In 1952, coins were introduced in denominations of 1, 3, 5, 10 and 25 bani, with the 1, 3 and 5 struck in aluminium bronze and the others in cupro-nickel. In 1955, cupro-nickel 50 bani were added.

In 1960, a new coinage was introduced, consisting of 15 and 25 bani, with 5 bani, 1 and 3 lei coins added in 1963. All were struck in nickel-clad steel. In 1975, aluminium replaced steel in the 5 and 15 bani, with the same change happening for the 25 bani in 1982. Aluminium 5 lei were introduced in 1978.

Socialist Republic of Romania

Post-Communist Romania
Following the end of the communist regime, a new coinage was introduced between 1990 and 1992, consisting of 1 leu in bronze clad steel, 5 and 10 lei in nickel-plated steel, 20 and 50 lei in brass clad steel and nickel-plated steel 100 lei.

As inflation took its toll, 500, 1,000 and 5,000 lei coins were introduced in 1999, 2000 and 2001, respectively, and were the only coins circulating when the revaluation occurred. They were all criticized for being clumsy and difficult to use. The 500 lei coins were very thick (about 0.3 cm). Despite their small value, it took only a handful of such coins to fill one's pocket. They were also made of poor material and could be occasionally found with bite marks. The 1000 lei coin was considered too small and was also cheaply made, and the 5000 lei coin was not circular (it was a dodecagon). This made it awkward to handle and difficult to use in slot machines, where it was frequently the only coin accepted. The 500, 1,000 and 5,000 lei coins became worth  5, 10 and 50 bani with the revaluation.

Fourth leu 
In 2005, the following coins were introduced for circulation:

References

 
Romanian leu